Godhra was a Lok Sabha parliamentary constituency in Gujarat, India. Most of its area is now covered by the Panchmahal Lok Sabha constituency, after the 2008 delimitation.

Members of Lok Sabha
1952-62: Does not Exist
1967: Piloo Mody, Swatantra Party
1971: Piloo Mody, Swatantra Party
1977: Hitendra Desai, Indian National Congress
1980: Jaideep Singh, Congress (Indira)
1984: Jaideep Singh, Congress (Died in 1987-88)
1988^ : P S Pursottam Bhai (Janata Party), in a bye-poll 
1989: Shantilal Patel, Indian National Congress
1991: Shankarsinh Vaghela, Bharatiya Janata Party
1996: Shantilal Patel, Janata Dal
1998: Shantilal Patel, Indian National Congress
1999: Bhupendrasinh Solanki, Bharatiya Janata Party
2004: Bhupendrasinh Solanki, Bharatiya Janata Party
2008 onwards : The Godhra constituency was reconstituted as Panchmahal seat in 2008 re-organization of Lok Sabha seats.

Election Results

1999 
 Solanki, Bhupendrasinh Prabhatsinh (BJP) : 280,684 votes 
 Patel, Shantilal Parshotamdas (INC) : 185,662

2004 
 Solanki, Bhupendrasinh Prabhatsinh (BJP) : 295,550 votes 
 Patel Rajendrasinh Balvantsinh (INC) : 241,831

References

See also
 Godhra
 List of Constituencies of the Lok Sabha
 Panchmahal Lok Sabha constituency

Former Lok Sabha constituencies of Gujarat
Panchmahal district
Former constituencies of the Lok Sabha